Waldenbooks, operated by the Walden Book Company, Inc., was an American shopping mall-based bookstore chain, from 1995 as a subsidiary of Borders Group. The chain also ran a video game and software chain under the name Waldensoftware, as well as a children's educational toy chain under Walden Kids. In 2011, the chain was liquidated in bankruptcy.

History
On March 4, 1933, Lawrence Hoyt (1902–1982), a former sales manager for Simon & Schuster, and Melvin T. Kafka (1905–1992) opened a rental library within leased space inside a Bridgeport, Connecticut, department store under the name Walden Book Company. The pair believed that their business would help people cope with the effects of The Great Depression. Books were lent out for three cents per day to save customers the cost of purchasing the books while providing affordable entertainment. By 1948, Hoyt and Kafka had opened 250 book rental locations. 

Hoyt opened the first Walden bookstore in Pittsburgh in 1962. Within 15 years, the company had grown to over 250 locations in leased locations within various department stores. With the increased availability of low-cost paperbacks after the Second World War, rental library services were eventually replaced with retail book selling.

Acquisitions
By the 1970s, the company had sales of just under $200 million. In 1969, it was purchased by the Broadway Hale Stores, a California-based department-stores holding company that was later renamed Carter Hawley Hale in 1974. For the stand-alone bookstores, the company initially traded under the name Walden Books, written as two words.  During the 1970s, the company gradually changed its trade name to Waldenbooks, written as a single word.

In 1984, Waldenbooks acquired three stores that were located in upscale neighborhoods from the bankrupted Brentano's chain with the original intent of converting the stores to the Waldenbooks brand, However, Waldenbooks discovered that when they continued to operate the newly acquired stores as Brentano's, the new stores were generating more sales than equivalent Waldenbooks, so Waldenbooks decided to continue and expand the Brentano's brand in selected upscale neighborhoods.

In 1984, Waldenbooks itself was acquired by Kmart after Carter Hawley Hales needed to get cash to defend itself from a hostile takeover attempt. At that time, Waldenbooks was the largest retail bookstore chain. Under Kmart's ownership, Walden attempted to expand and diversify its business. In 1985, it opened a discount book outlet chain called Reader's Market by converting five existing stand-alone Waldenbooks stores. A year later, Walden discontinued the discount bookstores after disappointing sales figures. Walden later tried this concept within selected Kmart stores.

After terminating the discount book strategy, Walden began experimenting with larger stores by opening Waldenbooks & More stores that included merchandise beyond books, WaldenSoftware computer software stores, and WaldenKids educational toys stores. In 1987, Waldenbooks acquired the U.S. stores of the Canadian bookstore chain Coles Book Stores Ltd. and gradually converted the stores to Waldenbooks. By 1990, Waldenbooks began to convert Waldenbooks & More into even larger Waldenbooks & More Books stores with a greatly expanded book selection.

In 1992, Walden opened nine book superstores under the Basset Book Shop name; ultimately these stores were converted to Borders locations after the merger.

Kmart expanded its bookstore holdings by acquiring Borders in 1992. At that time, Kmart kept Borders and Waldenbooks separate, but converted Waldenbook's Bassett stores to the Borders brand.

When Kmart decided to spin off its noncore subsidiaries in 1994, Kmart merged Waldenbooks, Brentano's, and Borders to form the Borders-Walden Group. At that time, Waldenbooks had 1,216 stores in all 50 states.  In 1995, the renamed Borders Group was able to buy back its stock and it was listed independently on the New York Stock Exchange.

Beginning in 2004, many Waldenbooks locations were rebranded as Borders Express stores. Borders Group, in an attempt to increase profits and lower the overall expense of their Waldenbooks brand, also announced that it was downsizing the Waldenbooks chain to respond to the current "competitive environment". In January 2010, 200 stores, almost two-thirds of the total, were closed.

On July 18, 2011, Borders Group filed for liquidation to close all of its remaining Waldenbooks and other stores. Liquidation commenced on July 22, 2011.

In popular culture
In season 4, episode 9 (Nov. 25, 1977 air date) of The Rockford Files titled "The Mayor's Committee from Deer Lick Falls", Jim Rockford is looking for someone in a mall and stands outside a Waldenbooks.
On July 16, 2018, streaming service Netflix released a teaser for the upcoming third season of its hit series Stranger Things. The ad was made in the style of a 1985 mall advertisement, and includes an image of a "newly opened" Waldenbooks store among its offerings. In reality, the crew of Stranger Things did a cosmetic restoration of a portion of the Gwinnett Place Mall in Duluth, Georgia, returning authentic signage and storefronts to the mall to represent many businesses that have since ceased to exist.

See also
List of defunct retailers of the United States

References

External links

Walden Book Company, Inc. Company Profileat Yahoo! finance 
Borders Group, Inc. Company Profileat Yahoo! finance 
History of Walden Book Company Inc. at FundingUniverse.com (1997)

Bookstores of the United States
Defunct retail companies of the United States
Defunct companies based in Connecticut
Companies based in Stamford, Connecticut
American companies established in 1933
Companies that filed for Chapter 11 bankruptcy in 2011
Retail companies established in 1933
Retail companies disestablished in 2011
1933 establishments in Connecticut
2011 disestablishments in the United States
Bookstores established in the 20th century
Kmart